The Nathaniel Backus House is a two-story Greek Revival clapboarded house with a gable roof in Norwich, Connecticut. The house was built around 1750 by Nathaniel Backus and served as his home, it was later moved to its current location in 1952. The house originally began as a Colonial, but was greatly modified to Greek Revival around 1825, reconfiguring the central door to the left of the facade and adding two chimneys. The house is a historic house museum operated by the Faith Trumbull Chapter of the Daughters of the American Revolution.

The Nathaniel Backus House was submitted to the National Register of Historic Places for its historical value in local history and as an example of Greek Revival domestic architecture. It was listed on the National Register of Historic Places (NRHP) in 1970 and was also included in the Chelsea Parade Historic District in 1989.

Nathaniel Backus 
The Nathaniel Backus House's namesake is its builder Nathaniel Backus, a descendant of William Backus and William Backus, Jr., two of the founders of Norwich, Connecticut. Nathaniel Backus was born on April 5, 1704, and he married Hannah Baldwin in 1726. Together they would have seven children. Nathaniel Backus was also recorded to be one of six men in Norwich to own their own carriages before the American Revolutionary War. Nathaniel Backus died in 1773.

Design 
The Nathaniel Backus House's construction date is unknown, but it is believed to have been around 1750. The History of Norwich, Connecticut places it around 1734 and makes mention of a highway being added in 1750 specifically by Nathaniel Backus' house. In the 1970 National Historic Register of Places nomination, the Daughters of the American Revolution indicated it dates from 1750.

The house originally stood on Broadway Street in the center of Norwich, Connecticut. It was originally Colonial at its time of construction, but has been modified to Greek Revival style. The renovation itself may date to around 1825. The house is a white two-story clapboarded structure with its gable end facing the street. The three-bay facade faces south and the front entrance is located on the left bay. The eaves cornice is decorated with mutules that span the length of the gable ends and combines with the roof cornice to make a pediment that encloses an elliptical window in the center. The window is of the "rising sun pattern" with glass panes radiating out through two rings. The entrance on the left of the facade has a paneled door, stated to be original, that is enclosed in a rectangular frame, supported by Ionic columns and framed by fluted moldings. The frames of the 6-over-6 windows project slightly from the clapboard exterior. The foundation and steps to the house is of stone.

An alteration saw the addition of two chimneys and additional alterations to the window and door openings on the northeast and southwest sides of the house. It is believed that the central door and window alterations were done as part of the Greek Revival renovations. Luyster states, "[f]urther investigation would undoubtedly reveal additional changes in the interior, including changes in the position of the fireplaces and their chimney connections."

Importance 
The Nathaniel Backus House is a historic house museum operated by the Faith Trumbull Chapter of the Daughters of the American Revolution following its completed move in 1952. The Nathaniel Backus House was submitted to the National Register of Historic Places for its historical value in local history and as an example of Greek Revival domestic architecture. Luyster writes, "The simplicity of the Backus house contrasts pleasantly with the verandahs and asymmetric forms of the surrounding buildings." It was listed on the National Register of Historic Places in 1970. The house was also included as part of the Chelsea Parade Historic District in 1989.

See also
National Register of Historic Places listings in New London County, Connecticut
Perkins-Rockwell House - another historic home located next door to the Nathaniel Backus House that is owned by the Faith Trumbull Chapter of the Daughters of the American Revolution

Notes

References

External links 
 

Houses on the National Register of Historic Places in Connecticut
Houses completed in 1750
Houses in Norwich, Connecticut
National Register of Historic Places in New London County, Connecticut
Museums in New London County, Connecticut